Oncotheca is a genus of tree endemic to New Caledonia. There are two species, Oncotheca balansae and Oncotheca humboldtiana.

Oncotheca is the sole genus of the Oncothecaceae, which is one of three families of flowering plants endemic to New Caledonia. Its placement has been enigmatic for a long time, but a recent phylogenetic analysis based on 73 plastid genes found it to be sister to Icacinaceae. It is now placed in the order Icacinales.

References 

Asterids
Trees of New Caledonia
Endemic flora of New Caledonia
Asterid genera
Taxa named by Henri Ernest Baillon